Bernard "Bernie" Bonner (22 July 1927 – 14 February 2005) was a Scottish professional footballer who played as a forward. Spending most of his playing career in Scotland, he made an appearance in the English Football League with Wrexham.

References

1927 births
2005 deaths
Scottish footballers
Association football forwards
Stonehouse Violet F.C. players
Dunfermline Athletic F.C. players
Airdrieonians F.C. players
Wrexham A.F.C. players
Blantyre Celtic F.C. players
English Football League players